Ace Fu Records is an independent record label founded in 1998 by Eric Speck. It is located in Williamsburg, Brooklyn. The label went on indefinite hiatus in 2007.

Roster
Acid Mothers Temple
Annuals
An Albatross
Aqui
The Dears
Devotchka
Ex Models
Illinois
Kaiser Chiefs
Man Man
Michael Leviton
Oneida
 Officer May
Parts & Labor
Pinback
Priestess
Runner and the Thermodynamics
Secret Machines
 The Sucka MCs
Ted Leo
Tunng

See also 
 List of record labels

External links
 Official site

American independent record labels
Indie rock record labels
Record labels established in 1998
Record labels disestablished in 2007